The 1999–2000 NBA season was the Nuggets' 24th season in the National Basketball Association, and 33rd season as a franchise. It was also their first year playing at the Pepsi Center. During the off-season, the Nuggets acquired Ron Mercer and Popeye Jones from the Boston Celtics, and signed free agent George McCloud. With Dan Issel back as head coach, the Nuggets had a solid nucleus of second-year star Raef LaFrentz, Antonio McDyess and Nick Van Exel with a 17–15 record to start the season. However, the Nuggets would struggle and slip below .500, holding a 21–27 record at the All-Star break. At the trade deadline, Mercer was dealt along with Chauncey Billups, who only played just 13 games due to a sprained ankle and a shoulder injury, and Johnny Taylor to the Orlando Magic in exchange for Tariq Abdul-Wahad and Chris Gatling. However, Billups never played for the Magic, because of his shoulder injury. The Nuggets went on a 7-game losing streak in March, as Bryant Stith only played just 45 games due to a leg injury. The team managed to win their final four games, and finished fifth in the Midwest Division with a 35–47 record.

McDyess averaged 19.1 points, 8.5 rebounds and 1.7 blocks per game, while Van Exel averaged 16.1 points and 9.0 assists per game, and LaFrentz provided the team with 12.4 points, 7.9 rebounds and 2.2 blocks per game. In addition, McCloud contributed 10.1 points per game off the bench, while second-year center Keon Clark averaged 8.6 points, 6.2 rebounds and 1.4 blocks per game, and top draft pick James Posey provided with 8.2 points per game, and was selected to the NBA All-Rookie Second Team.

Following the season, Stith and rookie guard Chris Herren were both traded to the Boston Celtics, while Gatling was traded back to the Miami Heat, who then sent him to the Cleveland Cavaliers, Jones was dealt to the Washington Wizards, and Cory Alexander signed as a free agent with the Orlando Magic.

Draft picks

Roster

Regular season

Season standings

z - clinched division title
y - clinched division title
x - clinched playoff spot

Record vs. opponents

Game log

Player statistics

Regular season

Player Statistics Citation:

Awards and records
 James Posey, NBA All-Rookie Team 2nd Team

Transactions

References

Denver Nuggets seasons
Denver
1999 in sports in Colorado
2000 in sports in Colorado